Cephalopsini is a tribe of big-headed flies (insects in the family Pipunculidae).

Genera
Cephalops Fallén, 1810
Cephalosphaera Enderlein, 1936

References

Pipunculidae
Brachycera tribes